Edmond Abazi (born 29 January 1968) is an Albanian retired international footballer who played as an attacking midfielder.

Club career
Abazi was born in Tirana. He made his league debut for Dinamo Tirana in 1985. He was one of the first players to move abroad after Albania's borders opened up in 1990 and he played for clubs such as Hajduk Split, S.L. Benfica, Boavista FC and Manchester City.

National team statistics

Honours
Albanian Superliga: 1986, 1990
Albanian Cup: 1989, 1990
Croatian League: 1992
Croatian Cup: 1993
Croatian Supercup: 1992, 1993
Portuguese Liga: 1994

References

External links
 
 
 Stats from Croatia at HRrepka.

1968 births
Living people
Footballers from Tirana
Albanian footballers
Association football midfielders
Albanian men's footballers
Albania international footballers
Kategoria Superiore players
FK Dinamo Tirana players
Albanian expatriate footballers
Albanian expatriate sportspeople in Croatia
Expatriate footballers in Croatia
Croatian Football League players
Expatriate footballers in Yugoslavia
Albanian expatriate sportspeople in Yugoslavia
Yugoslav First League players
HNK Hajduk Split players
HNK Šibenik players
Albanian expatriate sportspeople in Portugal
Expatriate footballers in Portugal
Primeira Liga players
S.L. Benfica footballers
Boavista F.C. players
Associação Académica de Coimbra – O.A.F. players
Albanian expatriate sportspeople in England
Expatriate footballers in England
Manchester City F.C. players
Albanian football managers
Shkumbini Peqin managers